Je Vous Aime (English title I Love You All) is a 1980 French romantic comedy film directed by Claude Berri. Its cast comprises notable actors and actresses like Jean Louis Trintignant, Catherine Deneuve, Gérard Depardieu and Serge Gainsbourg.  It was first released in 1980 and it was shown in the US in 1981.

Plot
Alice, a young business woman, struggles to find her life partner, a task she constantly fails to accomplish.  As she and Claude are about to break up, she starts reminiscing about her past relationships.  One night she invites her ex-lovers for dinner: Simon, an irascible singer who involves her in his artistic endeavors and with whom she constantly fights; Patrick, a young saxophone player who naively conquers her heart with his doe-eyed glance while accompanying one of Simon's songs; Julien, a tame and shy man who falls for Alice while helping her push her stalled car to a roadside during a thunderstorm.  A rather strange journey through her past begins, a journey made of laughs, bitter memories and, ultimately, the confirmation of why she and they are no longer together.

Additional information
Serge Gainsbourg wrote the music score for the movie.  Noteworthy is his song Dieu est un fumeur de havanes, which he duets with Deneuve in one of the scenes.

Cast
 Catherine Deneuve as Alice
 Jean-Louis Trintignant as Julien
 Gérard Depardieu as Patrick
 Serge Gainsbourg as Simon
 Alain Souchon as Claude
 Dominique Besnehard as Dominique
 Christian Marquand : Victor
 Igor Schlumberger : Jérôme
 Thomas Langmann : Loïc, Claude's son
 Isabelle Lacamp : Dorothée
 Dominique Besnehard : Hubert
 Marcel Romano : Francis
 Vanessa Guiomard : Jeanne

Awards

References

External links 
 
 

French romantic comedy films
1980s French-language films
1980 films
Films scored by Serge Gainsbourg
1980s French films